The discography of Joe Jonas, an American singer-songwriter, consists of one studio album, two singles, three promotional singles, three music videos and five album appearances.

Albums

Studio albums

Singles

As lead artist

As featured artist

Promotional singles

Other appearances

Music videos

Writing credits

Notes
Notes
A: "Just in Love" didn't enter the Billboard Hot 100, but peaked at number 3 on the Bubbling Under Hot 100 Singles.
B: It was released three versions of "Wouldn't Change a Thing" as single. The original version, as Demi Lovato featuring Jonas, was released in United States and Canada on July 25, 2010. In Brazil it was released a Brazilian-Portuguese version, "Eu Não Mudaria Nada Em Você", with Jullie on August 4. In Portugal the Portuguese version, "Nada Vou Mudar", was released on August 9, featured Mia Rose's vocals.
C: "Wouldn't Change a Thing" didn't enter the Billboard Hot 100, but peaked at number 10 on the Bubbling Under Hot 100 Singles.

References

Jonas Brothers
Pop music discographies
Discographies of American artists